Manufacturing Commercial Vehicles (MCV) is an Egyptian manufacturer for buses and trucks. The manufacturing plant is located in Salheya, the Head Office in Obour City, near Cairo. The manufacturer owns the trademark rights of the brands ECHOLINE, eVolution and MCV. Some models are assembled under the dual brand name Mercedes-Benz MCV.

History 
The company was founded in 1994 after a purchase of two factory facilities from the Ghabbour Group by Daimler AG. The production capacity in Egypt is 6,000 buses and 1,200 trucks a year.

Worldwide locations 
 Cuba: Since 1995 MCV Cuba is the official importer for vehicles of the Daimler AG. It is the only authorized dealer of Mercedes-Benz vehicles.
 Algeria: Since 2000 as importer
 United Arab Emirates (2002): Abu Dhabi
 United Kingdom (2002 after the purchase of Marshall Bus): Ely (MCV Bus & Coach)
 South Africa (Parow). 2007: Acquiring of the bus factory De Haan's Bus & Coach; annual production capacity: 150 buses. 
 Uzbekistan: In 2010 a joint venture with UzAvtosanoat was configured. The project is postponed.

Model overview

Commercial vehicles (passenger car classified) 
 Mercedes-Benz Sprinter (Generation T1N Mk. II)

Buses 
 ECHOLINE E10 / 20 (also known as Ecoline-DAFC and FOTON in the People's Republic of China)
 ECHOLINE E30 (also known as Ecoline-DAFC and FOTON in the People's Republic of China)
 ECHOLINE E40 (also known as Ecoline-DAFC and FOTON in the People's Republic of China)
 eVolution-MAN C100 / C110 / C120 (from 2004)
 eVolution-DENNIS C101 / C111 / C121 (from 2004)
 eVolution C123RLE (for Volvo B7RLE)
 eVolution C124RLE (for Mercedes-Benz OC500LE)
 MCV Evora
 MCV EvoSeti
 MCV Alfa
 MCV Ego (since 2006; Great Britain)
 MCV Stirling
 MCV DD103 (for Volvo B9TL)
 Mercedes-Benz MCV 200 Safari (since 2010, based on the Mercedes-Benz Atego)
 Mercedes-Benz MCV 240E (since 2008)
 Mercedes-Benz MCV 260C / R / S (since 2000)
 Mercedes-Benz MCV 260T 
 Mercedes-Benz MCV 400 E / H / R / T
 Mercedes-Benz MCV 500 (since 1996)
 Mercedes-Benz MCV 600 (since 1996)
 Mercedes-Benz MCV C120 / C120 LE
 Mercedes-Benz Tourismo
 Mercedes-Benz Travego (available in three different fronts)

Coaches
 MCV EvoTor

Trucks 
 Mercedes-Benz Actros (in licence of the Chinese Dongfeng Pika; vehicle parts are manufactured and delivered by Isuzu and Dongfeng Motor)
 Mercedes-Benz Atego 917 / 1325 AF / 1528 AF
 Mercedes-Benz Axor 1823 / 1923 / 1928
 Mercedes-Benz LN
 Mercedes-Benz MB 1728

References

External links
Manufacturing Commercial Vehicles official website
Mercedes-Benz MCV 600 Bus Exterior and Interior in 3D 4K UHD
Mercedes-Benz MCV 800 Bus Exterior and Interior in 3D

Vehicle manufacturing companies established in 1994
Bus manufacturers of Egypt
Egyptian brands
Truck manufacturers of Egypt
Qalyubiyya Governorate
Egyptian companies established in 1994